Wincham is a village and a civil parish in Cheshire West and Chester, England.  It contains two buildings that are recorded in the National Heritage List for England as designated listed buildings, both of which are listed at Grade II.  This grade is the lowest of the three gradings given to listed buildings and is applied to "buildings of national importance and special interest".  Running through the parish are the Trent and Mersey Canal, and the Wincham Brook.  The parish is partly rural, and was formerly the site of salt mining.  The listed buildings comprise a farmhouse and a canal milepost.

References

Listed buildings in Cheshire West and Chester
Lists of listed buildings in Cheshire